is a Rinzai Zen Buddhist temple in Matsuo, Nishikyō Ward, Kyoto, Japan. The temple, primarily constructed to honor Amitābha, was first founded by Gyōki and was later restored by Musō Soseki. In 1994, Saihō-ji was registered as a UNESCO World Heritage Site, as part of the "Historic Monuments of Ancient Kyoto". Over 120 types of moss are present in the two-tiered garden, resembling a beautiful green carpet with many subtle shades.

History
According to temple legend, Saihō-ji was constructed during the Nara period by Gyōki, on the location of one of Prince Shōtoku's former retreats. Legend states that such famous Japanese monks as Kūkai and Hōnen later served as the chief priests of the temple. Although the veracity of these legends is questionable, it is believed that such a predecessor to the current temple did, in fact, exist.

Over time, the temple fell into disrepair, and in 1339, the chief priest of the nearby Matsunoo Shrine, Fujiwara Chikahide, summoned the famous Japanese gardener Musō Soseki to help him revive Saihō-ji as a Zen temple. At this time, Musō decided to change the temple's name, to reflect its new Zen orientation. Saihō-ji was destroyed by fire during the Ōnin War, and twice ravaged by floods during the Edo period, but has since been rebuilt.

The moss for which the temple is known was not part of Musō's original design.  According to French historian François Berthier, the garden's "islands" were "carpeted with white sand" in the fourteenth century. The moss came much later, of its own accord during the Meiji era (1868–1912), when the monastery lacked sufficient funds for upkeep.

Layout

The famous moss garden of Saihō-ji is situated in the eastern temple grounds. The area around the pond is said to be covered with more than 120 varieties of moss, believed to have started growing after the flooding of the temple grounds in the Edo Period.

Shōnan-tei was originally built during the 14th century, but was subsequently destroyed.  It was later restored by Sen Shōan.  Iwakura Tomomi was famously sheltered here towards the end of the Edo Period. Shōnan-tei is registered as an important cultural property.
Shōan-dō was constructed in 1920, and contains a wooden image of Sen Shōan, after whom the teahouse was named.
Tanhoku-tei was donated to the temple in 1928 by potter Zōroku Mashimizu.

The eastern temple grounds also contains the main temple hall, the study, and a three-storied pagoda.
The paintings on the sliding doors are the work of Inshō Dōmoto.
The three-storied pagoda was erected in 1978, and is used to store copies of sutras, written by Rinzai adherents.  The pagoda was constructed to honor Bhaisajyaguru.

The arrangement of stones in the rock garden is said to be demonstrative of Musō's creative genius.

The gardens of Saihō-ji are collectively considered to be both a historical landmark and a "special place of scenic beauty" in Japan.

Other significant items within the temple grounds include a stone monument engraved with a Kyoshi Takahama haiku, and another stone monument, engraved with some of the writings of Jirō Osaragi.  A portrait of Musō Soseki is considered to be an important cultural property.

Tourism

Until 1977, Saihō-ji was open to the general public on a walk-up basis, as with other temples. At present, while it is open to the public, a number requirement limits the number of visitors. It is said that these regulations were put into place to protect the delicate moss from the hordes of tourists that plagued the temple before 1977.

 Reservations are required by prior application by return postcard (international visitors send a postcard or letter with an international reply coupon); as of May 2010 they prefer for the application to arrive up to 7 working days before the intended visit; there is only one visit per day, with time varying, so time of visit cannot be specified.
 The fee to visit (¥3,000) is the highest in Kyoto. 
 Visitors are given access to the grounds for 90 minutes. 
 Before being permitted access to the garden, visitors must engage in an activity, which varies from day to day. These include zazen (sitting meditation), hand copying sutras, and chanting sutras. One is then asked to write down one's wish, name, and address. The monks keep all the sutras in the pagoda and continue to pray for all.

The best time to visit is either during the East Asian rainy season (in Kyoto, early June to mid-July), when the rains make the moss particularly lush, or in late autumn, when the turning leaves contrast with the moss.

See also

List of Special Places of Scenic Beauty, Special Historic Sites and Special Natural Monuments
 Glossary of Japanese Buddhism – for an explanation of terms concerning Japanese Buddhism, Japanese Buddhist art, and Japanese Buddhist temple architecture.

References

Much of the content of this article comes from the equivalent Japanese-language article, accessed on July 1, 2006.

Further reading

External links

Kyoto Prefectural Tourism Guide for Saihō-ji
Kokedera (Moss Temple) at japan-guide.com – details of procedure and visit protocol
"Saiho-ji", in Japanese Gardens at Bowdoin College – explains design and shows views of garden
Saihō-ji - Japanese gardens
- Saiho-ji Temple (Koke-dera Temple)

Buddhist temples in Kyoto
Gardens in Kyoto Prefecture
World Heritage Sites in Japan
Rinzai temples
Special Places of Scenic Beauty
Important Cultural Properties of Japan
Historic Sites of Japan
Zen gardens